Almelo is a municipality and a city in the eastern Netherlands. The main population centres in the town are Aadorp, Almelo, Mariaparochie, and Bornerbroek.

Almelo has about 72,000 inhabitants in the middle of the rolling countryside of Twente, with the industrial centres of Enschede and Hengelo as close neighbours but also with tourist towns like Ootmarsum, Delden and Markelo only a bicycle ride away. Almelo received city rights in 1394.  Within the city limits lies the castle of the Counts of Almelo.

Located in the city centre is Huize Almelo, a castle that in its current form dates back to 1662 (This castle is not open to the public). There are mosaics which decorate the walls of the tunnel close to the railway station.

The city is also known for its local association football club Heracles Almelo, which plays in the Eerste divisie, the second highest football league in the Netherlands. The club uses the Erve Asito.

History
At the end of the 19th century textile emerged as a major employer and drew many workers to Almelo, at first from within the Netherlands. Since the 1960s workers from Spain and Turkey came to Almelo. The first mosque of the Netherlands was built in Almelo in 1976 for the Turkish population of the city. Almelo also has a sizeable number of Armenians who built their own Armenian Apostolic Church in 2003.

In the 1970s the industry dwindled and most factories were relocated to countries with cheaper labour. Some factories remain in the city centre and are now in use for apartments or offices.

Topography

Topographic map of Almelo, Sept. 2014

Economy
Currently, a major employer in Almelo is Urenco Nederland. This is a uranium enrichment plant which uses the gas centrifuge method and produces uranium with about five percent U-235, for nuclear reactors. An industrial bakery, Bolletje, Malvern Panalytical, the Stichting Ziekenhuisgroep Twente (a hospital) and the regional court are also major employers.

Transport

Almelo has 2 railway stations:

Almelo railway station
Almelo de Riet railway station

The main station is Almelo and offers links to Hengelo, Enschede, Amersfoort, Amsterdam Airport Schiphol, Utrecht, Gouda, Rotterdam, The Hague and Zwolle. There is also a train every 2 hours into Germany serving cities such as Osnabrück, Hannover and Berlin.

Sport

Football
Heracles Almelo, a professional football club playing in the Eerste Divisie is based in Almelo.

Cycling
Since 1983 Almelo has organised the Profronde van Almelo, an elite men's and women's professional road bicycle racing event.

Notable people 

 Catharina Julia Roeters van Lennep (1813–1883) a Dutch artist
Bertha Tideman-Wijers (1887-1976) composer
 Izaak Kolthoff (1894–1993) an analytical chemist and chemistry educator
 Judith Ledeboer OBE (1901–1990) architect
 Evert Willem Beth (1908-1964) philosopher and logician
 Gerritdina Benders-Letteboer (1909–1980) an active member of the Dutch Resistance
 Wubbo Ockels (1946-2014) a physicist and astronaut of the European Space Agency
 Herman Finkers (born 1954) comedian, known for his friendly, dry-witted humour 
 Tom Egbers (born 1957) a Dutch English journalist, writer and TV presenter 
 Liesbeth van Tongeren (born 1958) a Dutch politician, Director of Greenpeace Netherlands 2003–2010, grew up in Almelo
 Hero Brinkman (born 1964) a police officer and former Dutch politician
 Jos de Blok (born 1960) founder and CEO of Buurtzorg
 Michiel Veenstra (born 1976) Radio-dj on KINK
 Ilse de Lange (born 1977) a Dutch country and pop rock singer-songwriter
 Loes Haverkort (born 1981) a Dutch movie, TV and theater actress 
 Azra Akın (born 1981) Miss Turkey World 2002 and Miss World 2002
 Bram Schreuder (born 1996) a Dutch master of arts in recreational weekend activities and allround professional in boisterous buffoonery, currently residing in Grand Duchy of Luxembourg

Sports 
 Kea Bouman (1903 – 1998) female tennis player; only Dutch female tennis player to win a Grand Slam singles tournament
 Lex Mullink (born 1944) a retired rower, bronze medallist at the 1964 Summer Olympics
 Hendrie Krüzen (born 1964) football midfielder, over 500 club caps
 Brian van Loo (born 1975) retired soccer goalkeeper, 261 club caps 
 Marnix Smit (born 1975) retired soccer player, 231 club caps with Heracles Almelo
 Arnold Bruggink (born 1977) retired soccer player, 447 club caps
 Mark Looms (born 1981) soccer player, 329 club caps
 Kirsten Wild (born 1982) track and road race cyclist; multiple National Champion
 Marc Höcher (born 1984) a Dutch football player with over 350 club caps
 Dennis Kuipers (born 1985) a Dutch rally driver
 Anouk Dekker (born 1986) a Dutch footballer with over 250 club caps
 Fabian Roosenbrand (born 1988) a Dutch professional darts player
 Maret Balkestein-Grothues (born 1988) a Dutch volleyball player
 Maud Roetgering (born 1992) a football defender 184 caps with FC Twente Vrouwen

International relations

Twin towns — Sister cities
Almelo is twinned with:

See also
 Ambt Almelo

Gallery

References

External links

 
Cities in the Netherlands
Municipalities of Overijssel
Populated places in Overijssel
Twente